The 2020–21 Tahiti Ligue 1 is the 74nd season of the Tahiti Ligue 1, the top-flight football league in Tahiti. The season started on 08 October 2020. A.S. Pirae are the defending champions.

Format Change
Due to a 3-month interruption caused by the Covid-19 pandemic, only a single round robin will be played, followed by a playoff between the top-4 to determine the championship and qualification for the OFC Champions League

Teams
A total of thirteen teams compete in the league. Due the COVID-19 pandemic in French Polynesia, the last season was cancelled with no relegation. Excelsior, Mataiea and Arue were promoted. Taravao AC changed name to AS Pueu.

Stadium and locations
Note: Table lists in alphabetical order.

Personnel and sponsoring
Note: Flags indicate national team as has been defined under FIFA eligibility rules. Players may hold more than one non-FIFA nationality.

League table

Regular season

Championship play-off

Relegation play-off

Promotion/relegation play-0ff

Manu-Ura relegated after losing promotion/relegation play-off.

Top scorers

Most goals in a single game
 6 goals:
 Teaonui Tehau (Venus) 1-10 against Excelsior, round 4, 1 November 2020.

Hat-tricks

References

External links
Fédération Tahitienne de Football
, FTF
Sports Tahiti

Tahiti Ligue 1 seasons
Tahiti Ligue 1